Luigi Vendramini (born January 16, 1996) is a Brazilian professional male mixed martial artist who competed in the Lightweight division of the Ultimate Fighting Championship.

Background
Vendramini started practising Brazilian jiu-jitsu at the age of 12 to lose weight, transitioning to mixed martial arts a year later. His father Augusto is a Brazilian jiu-jitsu black belt, and he put Vendramini on the path to becoming a fighter, remaining his trainer to this day.

A native of Brazil, Vendramini also owns Italian and Swiss passports through his father and mother, respectively.

Being away from the cage for 758 days after his UFC debut, and unable to get paid for his work as a fighter, Vendramini decided to help his family business in the meantime. His parents are mushroom producers and have run a bakery in Brasilia for half a century.

Mixed martial arts career

Early career
Starting his professional career in 2016, Vendramini compiled an undefeated 8–0 record on the regional Brazilian scene, winning all 8 bouts via stoppage.

Ultimate Fighting Championship
Vendramini, as a replacement for Belal Muhammad, moved up in weight and faced Elizeu Zaleski dos Santos on a weeks notice on September 22, 2018, at UFC Fight Night: Santos vs. Anders. He lost the fight via knockout in round two.

Vendramini suffered an injury – a tear in the knee ligament – which he felt in the first round left “The Italian Stallion” about seven months away from training. After the inactive period, Vendramini was scheduled to face Nick Hein on June 1, 2019, at UFC on ESPN+ 11. However, Vendramini pulled out of the bout in late April citing a new tear in the same knee and subsequent surgery, which left him unable to compete for eight months.

Following the second surgery, the doctor said that the first surgeon did the wrong surgery, meaning that he lost a year of his career due to a medical error.

Vendramini made his sophomore appearance in the organization against Jessin Ayari on October 4, 2020, at UFC on ESPN: Holm vs. Aldana. He won the fight via technical knockout in round one. This win earned him the Performance of the Night bonus.

Vendramini faced Farès Ziam on June 12, 2021, at UFC 263. He lost the fight via majority decision.

Vendramini faced Paddy Pimblett on September 4, 2021, at UFC Fight Night 191. He lost the fight via knockout in round one.

On May, 2022 it was reported that Vendramini was released by UFC.

Championships and accomplishments

Mixed martial arts
Ultimate Fighting Championship
Performance of the Night (One Time) vs. Jessin Ayari

Mixed martial arts record

|-
|Loss
|align=center|9–3
|Paddy Pimblett
|KO (punches)
|UFC Fight Night: Brunson vs. Till 
|
|align=center|1
|align=center|4:25
|Las Vegas, Nevada, United States
|
|-
|Loss
|align=center|9–2
|Farès Ziam
|Decision (majority)
|UFC 263 
|
|align=center|3
|align=center|5:00
|Glendale, Arizona, United States
|
|-
|Win
|align=center|9–1
|Jessin Ayari
|TKO (head kick and punches)
|UFC on ESPN: Holm vs. Aldana
|
|align=center|1
|align=center|1:12
|Abu Dhabi, United Arab Emirates
|
|-
| Loss
| align=center| 8–1
| Elizeu Zaleski dos Santos
|KO (flying knee and punches)
|UFC Fight Night: Santos vs. Anders
|
|align=center|2
|align=center|1:20
|São Paulo, Brazil
|
|-
| Win
| align=center| 8–0
| Lucas Eurico
| TKO (punches)
| Samurai Fight 1
| 
| align=center| 1
| align=center| 3:57
| Brasília, Brazil
| 
|-
| Win
| align=center| 7–0
| Adriano Andre
| TKO (punches)
| Aspera FC 56
| 
| align=center| 1
| align=center| 0:33
| Brasília, Brazil
| 
|-
| Win
| align=center| 6–0
| Geter Lírio
| Submission (rear-naked choke)
| The Warriors Combat 4
| 
| align=center| 1
| align=center| 2:45
| Brasília, Brazil
| 
|-
| Win
| align=center| 5–0
| David Alan Silva
| TKO (punches)
| IFC MMA Combat 6
| 
| align=center| 1
| align=center| 0:10
| Ceres, Brazil
| 
|-
| Win
| align=center| 4–0
| Robson Correira da Silva
| Submission (anaconda choke)
| Centro Oeste Fight 6
| 
| align=center| 1
| align=center| 1:16
| Brasília, Brazil
| 
|-
| Win
| align=center| 3–0
| João Paulo
| Submission (kimura)
| Aspera FC 45
|  
| align=center| 1
| align=center| 3:25
| Brasília, Brazil
|
|-
| Win
| align=center| 2–0
| Odair Tarrafa
| Submission (anaconda choke)
| Centro Oeste Fight 5
| 
| align=center| 1
| align=center| 1:40
| Brasília, Brazil
|
|-
| Win
| align=center|1–0
| Guilherme de Carvalho
| TKO (punches)
| Magal Fight 1
| 
| align=center|2
| align=center|2:05
| Alexânia, Brazil
|
|-

See also 
 List of male mixed martial artists

References

External links
 
 

1996 births
Living people
Lightweight mixed martial artists
Mixed martial artists utilizing Brazilian jiu-jitsu
Brazilian male mixed martial artists
Ultimate Fighting Championship male fighters
Sportspeople from Brasília
Brazilian practitioners of Brazilian jiu-jitsu
People awarded a black belt in Brazilian jiu-jitsu
Brazilian people of Italian descent
Brazilian people of Swiss descent